Bucktown is an unincorporated community in Hardin County, Tennessee. Bucktown is located northeast of Savannah.

References

Unincorporated communities in Hardin County, Tennessee
Unincorporated communities in Tennessee